Kapel can refer to:

 a kippah
 Kapel, Gelderland, Netherlands
 Kapel, North Holland, Netherlands